The Pennsylvania Housing Finance Agency is a non-profit organization which serves the people of Pennsylvania by offering affordable housing resources, including loans and rent assistance. PHFA was created by an Executive Order by the Pennsylvania General Assembly in 1972.

Board of directors
PHFA is governed by a 14-member Board appointed by the Governor of Pennsylvania. The Board of the Pennsylvania Housing Finance Agency (PHFA) sets policy and oversees the organization's operations. The Board consists of the Secretary of Pennsylvania Department of Banking, the Secretary of Pennsylvania Department of Community and Economic Development, the Secretary of Pennsylvania Department of Human Services, and the Pennsylvania State Treasurer serve by virtue of their offices. Four members are named to the Board by the majority and minority leaders of the Pennsylvania State Senate and Pennsylvania House of Representatives. Six private citizen members are appointed by the Governor and confirmed by the State Senate.

Functions
As a mission-driven, nonprofit corporation providing affordable housing products to the citizens of the Commonwealth of Pennsylvania, PHFA offers programs and administers funds on behalf of state (Pennsylvania Department of State), Federal government of the United States, and tax related programs and receives fees to deliver these programs.  In addition to its major programs, PHFA conducts housing studies, promotes counseling and education for renters and homebuyers, encourages supportive services at apartments it has financed, administers rent subsidy contracts for the Federal government of the United States, and acts as an advocate to promote the benefits of decent, affordable shelter for those who need it most.

History
As of January 2020, PHFA has generated nearly $14.6 billion of funding for more than 178,325 single-family home mortgage loans, helped fund the construction of 136,215 rental units, distributed more than $109.2 million to support local housing initiatives, and saved the homes of more than 50,200 families from foreclosure.

See also
 National Council of State Housing Agencies
 Federal Housing Finance Agency
 United States Department of Housing and Urban Development
 National Housing Act of 1934
 List of Pennsylvania state agencies

See also: Other HFAs
 California Housing Finance Agency
 Kentucky Housing Corporation
 Oklahoma Housing Finance Agency
 Oregon Housing and Community Services Department
 Minnesota Housing Finance Agency
 New York State Housing Finance Agency
 Vermont Housing Finance Agency

Further reading
 Affordable housing
 Section 8 (housing)
 Low-Income Housing Tax Credit
 Multi-family residential
 Rural Housing Service
 Public housing
 Subsidized housing

References

External links

State agencies of Pennsylvania
Housing finance agencies of the United States
Government agencies established in 1972